Nichols is an unincorporated community in Hazelton Township, Aitkin County, Minnesota, United States, along the north shore of Mille Lacs Lake. The community is located along U.S. 169 / State Highway 18 (co-signed) near 450th Avenue. Nearby places include Garrison, Malmo, Cutler, and Aitkin.

References

Unincorporated communities in Aitkin County, Minnesota
Unincorporated communities in Minnesota